Jackie Jameson was an Irish soccer player during the 1970s and 1980s.

Career 
Jameson represented Shamrock Rovers, Dundalk (loan), St. Patrick's Athletic and Bohemians during his career. He is known around Dalymount Park as "The Great Man". He was inducted into the Bohemian F.C. Hall of Fame in November 2007.

Jameson played his schoolboy football at Lourdes Celtic and Cherry Orchard before moving into League of Ireland football with Shamrock Rovers in 1975.

He made a scoring debut on 21 October 1975 in a FAI League Cup tie while in the previous month on 11 September he scored against Japan in a 3-2 win in Tokyo. He struggled, however, to gain regular first team football under John Giles and after only 5 appearances he moved to St Patrick's Athletic in 1978 where he began to establish himself as a player of some class. He spent 3 seasons at Pats, reaching a FAI Cup Final in 1980 (losing to Waterford) before he joined Billy Young's Bohemians in 1981. He scored on his league debut on 13 September against Sligo, the same day Paul Doolin, who also scored, made his debut.

He spent 9 years at Dalymount Park until his retirement in 1990. Jackie would end up as Bohemian's top league scorer in 5 of those seasons. He was runner up in the FAI Cup in 1982 and 1983 and runner up in the League of Ireland in 1984 and 1985. He was never capped at full international level either. However, he was on the League of Ireland XI and played in Olympic qualifiers. He played 303 competitive matches for Bohs after making his debut against Shelbourne on 30 August 1981 with his last game on 28 January 1990 against UCD. Scored once in six European appearances.

Death and legacy 
Jackie Jameson died in 2002. He is still a legend amongst the Bohs fans and many songs and flags have been created in honour of him.

A Facebook tribute page was set up in 2012. It can be found under the name Jackie Jameson Irish Football Legend.

One of the three function rooms in Dalymount Park is named The Jackie Jameson Bar.

References 

Republic of Ireland association footballers
Association football forwards
League of Ireland players
Shamrock Rovers F.C. players
Bohemian F.C. players
St Patrick's Athletic F.C. players
1957 births
2002 deaths
League of Ireland XI players
Cherry Orchard F.C. players